The Texas League Manager of the Year Award is an annual award given to the best manager in Minor League Baseball's Texas League based on their regular-season performance as voted on by league managers. Broadcasters, Minor League Baseball executives, and members of the media have previously voted as well. Though the league was established in 1888, the award was not created until 1955. The Texas League suspended operations during World War II from 1943 to 1945. After the cancellation of the 2020 season, the league was known as the Double-A Central in 2021 before reverting to the Texas League name in 2022.

The only manager to win the award on three occasions is Jackie Moore, who won in 2000, 2001, and 2004. Four others have each won twice: Red Davis, Andy Gilbert, Tim Ireland, and Phillip Wellman. Davis (1955 and 1956) and Moore (2000 and 2001) won the award in consecutive years.

Eight managers from the El Paso Diablos have been selected for the Manager of the Year Award, more than any other team in the league, followed by the San Antonio Missions (6); the Midland RockHounds (5); the Amarillo Gold Sox, Arkansas Travelers, Corpus Christi Hooks, Frisco RoughRiders, Jackson Generals, and Tulsa Drillers (4); the Dallas Eagles and Round Rock Express (3); the Dallas–Fort Worth Spurs, Shreveport Captains, and Wichita Wranglers (2); and the Albuquerque Dodgers, Alexandria Aces, Amarillo Sod Poodles, Houston Buffaloes, Lafayette Drillers, Memphis Blues, Northwest Arkansas Naturals, Rio Grande Valley Giants, Tulsa Oilers, Victoria Rosebuds, and Wichita Wind Surge (1).

Nine managers from the Houston Astros Major League Baseball (MLB) organization have won the award, more than any other, followed by the San Francisco Giants and Texas Rangers organizations (8); the San Diego Padres organization (7); the St. Louis Cardinals organization (6); the Los Angeles Angels organization (5); the Milwaukee Brewers and New York Mets organizations (4); the Kansas City Royals, Los Angeles Dodgers, and Oakland Athletics organizations (3); the Chicago Cubs organization (2); and the Baltimore Orioles, Cleveland Guardians, Minnesota Twins, and Seattle Mariners organizations (1).

Winners

Wins by team

Active Texas League teams appear in bold.

Wins by organization

Active Texas League–Major League Baseball affiliations appear in bold.

Notes

References
Specific

General

Awards established in 1955
Minor league baseball coaching awards
Manager